Foothill Boulevard may refer to:
Foothill Boulevard (Southern California)
Foothill Boulevard (East Bay, California)
Foothill Drive, also called Foothill Boulevard, in Salt Lake City, Utah